A Woman of the World is a 1925 American silent comedy-drama film starring Pola Negri, directed by Mal St. Clair, produced by Famous Players-Lasky, and distributed by Paramount Pictures.

Plot
As described in a review in a film magazine, Countess Natatorini (Negri) seeks to forget a faithless lover by visiting her distant American cousin Sam Poore (Conklin) and his wife Lou (Ward) in their Midwestern home. Richard Granger (Herbert), newly elected district attorney and crusading reformer, shocked when he sees her violating the town social norms he is enforcing by smoking a cigarette in public, finds that he is strongly attracted to her. At a community meeting, the Countess finds that the townspeople are selling the right to talk to a real Countess at a quarter a head, and her annoyance builds when one curious old man offers to donate another quarter if she will show the tattoo mark that is the ineradicable reminder of the faithless foreign lover she wants to forget. Later, Sam seeks to console her and brings her laughter by showing that he has a railroad train tattoo running from his right wrist to his left hand, clear across his chest. After a series of innocent events between the Countess and his assistant Gareth Johns (Mack) arouses his jealousy, Richard denounces her alleged immorality and demands that she be ordered out of town. She avenges the insult with a horsewhip she gets from Lou, but when she draws blood from Richard she forgets all but her love, and we last see the pair in a hack on the way to the train station and the honeymoon, and he offers her the cigarettes he once denounced so strongly.

Cast

References

External links

Review with stills at moviessilently.com
Swedish language lobby poster
Still at silentfilmstillarchive.com
Still with the Countess showing her tattoo

1925 films
American silent feature films
1925 comedy-drama films
American black-and-white films
Films directed by Malcolm St. Clair
1920s English-language films
1920s American films
Silent American comedy-drama films